The suburbs of Perth and Northbridge were combined until 1982 when Northbridge was established as a separate suburb.

Streets starting with A or B

Streets starting with C or D

Streets starting with E or F

Streets starting with G or H

Streets starting with I or J

Streets starting with K or L

Streets starting with M or N

Streets starting with O or P

Streets starting with Q or R

Streets starting with S or T

Streets starting with V

Streets starting with W, X, Y or Z

See also
List of streets in East Perth
List of streets and paths in Kings Park
List of streets in West Perth
List of streets in Crawley and Nedlands
List of streets in Bayswater, Western Australia
List of streets in Kardinya, Western Australia

References

City of Perth
 
Perth
Perth
Perth, Western Australia-related lists
Perth